Pasha Kola-ye Bish Mahalleh (also Romanized as Pāshā Kolā-ye Bīsh Maḩalleh; also known as Pāshā Kolā) is a village in Harazpey-ye Jonubi Rural District, in the Central District of Amol County, Mazandaran Province, Iran. At the 2006 census, its population was 291, in 71 families.

References 

Populated places in Amol County